Othell Maxie Burns Jr. (born November 8, 1948) is an American politician and academic from the state of Georgia. A member of the Republican Party, Burns has represented the 23rd district in the Georgia State Senate since January 2021. He previously served in the United States House of Representatives from 2003 to 2005, representing . From 2012 to 2017 he was the president of Gordon State College in Barnesville, Georgia.

Early life and education
Max Burns was born in Millen, Georgia. Burns received a Bachelor of Science degree in industrial engineering from the Georgia Institute of Technology, a Master of Business Administration in information systems from Georgia State University and a Doctor of Business Administration from Georgia State University.

Career 
Burns also served as a member of the United States Army Reserve from 1973 to 1981. He served as a member of the Screven County Commission from 1993 to 1998 and as chairman towards the end of his tenure.

Prior to his tenure in Congress, he was a professor of information systems at Georgia Southern University's College of Business Administration in Statesboro, Georgia. Burns was also a Senior Fulbright Scholar, teaching Corporate Information Management in Sweden. He has also taught in Australia, New Zealand, and South Korea.

Burns has also worked as a consultant to Gulfstream Aerospace and Grinnell Mechanical Products. He also developed the Southern Suppliers' Network to connect Southeast Georgia's small business suppliers to major manufacturers. Earlier in his professional career, the Congressman served in information management positions with Oxford Industries and the North American Mission Board of the Southern Baptist Convention.

After leaving Congress, Burns was dean of the Mike Cottrell Business School at North Georgia College & State University in Dahlonega, Georgia.

After his final bid to regain his congressional seat, Burns served as senior policy adviser at Thelen, Reid and Priest, LLP in Washington, D.C. He also served as associate dean and chair of the business administration department at the Cottrell School of Business at North Georgia College & State University. In 2011, he was appointed as president of Gordon College. He served in that role until his retirement on December 31, 2017.

Elections

2002 
Burns won the Republican primary for the 12th district, one of two Georgia gained after the 2000 Census. He defeated Barbara Dooley, the wife of University of Georgia coaching legend Vince Dooley.

Initially, Burns was thought to be a significant underdog in the general election. The 12th had been drawn as a Democratic stronghold. Additionally, Burns ran on a very conservative platform. However, the Democratic candidate, Augusta businessman Charles "Champ" Walker, Jr., son of state Senate majority leader Charles Walker, Sr., was dogged by ethical questions and began losing ground during the summer. Eventually, Burns won by a surprising 10-point margin, taking 55% to Walker's 45 percent.

2004 
Burns was elected president of the Republican freshman class, but was a top Democratic target in the 2004 elections. His 2004 Democratic opponent was Athens-Clarke County Commissioner John Barrow, who beat Burns 52% to 48%.

2006 
In May 2005, Burns announced that he would seek a rematch against Barrow in 2006. The state legislature, now controlled by Republicans, had conducted a highly controversial mid-decade redistricting. In the process, they drew Barrow's home in Athens out of the district and moved several Republican-leaning Savannah suburbs from the 1st District. Although the result was to make the 12th about five points more African-American than its predecessor, it was also slightly less Democratic.

Barrow narrowly defeated Burns, 50.3% to 49.7%, the closest margin for a Democratic incumbent in the cycle. While Burns won 14 of the district's 22 counties, he lost in the two largest counties, Chatham and Richmond, home to Savannah and Augusta respectively. President George W. Bush made two personal appearances campaigning on behalf of former Representative Burns. The first appearance by President Bush was in Savannah, Georgia and the second in Statesboro, Georgia. This was the second time a sitting president has visited Savannah Georgia and first time a sitting president has visited Statesboro Georgia.

Electoral history

References

External links 

 
 "Curb Your Enthusiasm" — The Rothenberg Political Report

1948 births
Living people
Heads of universities and colleges in the United States
County commissioners in Georgia (U.S. state)
Georgia Southern University faculty
Georgia State University alumni
Georgia Tech alumni
Republican Party Georgia (U.S. state) state senators
Republican Party members of the United States House of Representatives from Georgia (U.S. state)
People from Millen, Georgia
People from Sylvania, Georgia
21st-century American politicians
Members of Congress who became lobbyists